AW II is the second studio album by Ataxia, released on May 29, 2007 on Record Collection. The album is the second half of the band's sole recording session which took place in January 2004.  The lineup features John Frusciante on guitars and vocals, Josh Klinghoffer on drums, and Joe Lally's bass guitar.  The album is released under the Record Collection label, as is the solo work of Klinghoffer and Frusciante.

The album was leaked onto the internet in March 2006. However, there are several differences between the leak and the properly released record. The track listing has been rearranged, some of the tracks have been renamed and the sound of the tracks has undergone minor changes. Upon release there were few physical copies of AW II, and the album was ultimately reissued on October 26, 2009. The reissue is no longer available from the record label as of April 2012.

The vinyl edition of the record saw a repressing from Record Collection on December 11, 2012.  These reissued records are 180 gram and come with a download of choice between MP3 and WAV formats of the album.

In March 2008, regarding the band's cult following and AW II'''s delayed release, bassist Joe Lally stated:

Track listing

Personnel
The following people contributed to AW II'':

Band
John Frusciante – guitar, synthesizer, vocals
Joe Lally – bass
Josh Klinghoffer – drums, synthesizer, vocals ("The Empty's Response")

Recording personnel
John Frusciante - producer
Ryan Hewitt - engineer, mixing
Dave Collins - mastering

Artwork
Lola Montes - photography
Mike Piscitelli - design
John Frusciante - design

References

John Frusciante albums
2007 albums
Record Collection albums